Sewerby Hall (also known as Sewerby House) is a Grade I listed Georgian country house set in  of landscaped gardens in the village of Sewerby,  from the seaside town of Bridlington in the East Riding of Yorkshire, England.

The main block was built circa 1714, incorporating some older work, in 3 storeys in brick with a seven window frontage. In 1808, 2-storey bow fronted wings and a semi-circular Doric portico were added and the whole building painted to resemble stone. The wings were later raised to 3 storeys.

History 
John Greame, son of Robert Greame, was the first of the Greame family to live at the old manor house at Sewerby. He had become quite wealthy on the death of his father in 1708 and bought the estate from Elizabeth Carleill, the last of the previous family to own the property.

He built the present Sewerby Hall between 1714–1720, replacing the manor house which had existed on the site for many years. John died in 1746 at the age of 83. His son John Greame II died childless in 1798 at the age of 98, and his widow Alicia Maria (née Spencer) stayed on at the hall until her own death in 1812. It then passed to a nephew, a third John Greame, who had married an heiress, Sarah Yarburgh of Heslington Hall, York. Sarah had died young and John Greame III had remarried and moved with his second wife to live in Sewerby Hall with his Aunt Almary.

He commissioned a number of alterations including the addition of a portico in 1808. On his death in 1841 ownership passed to his eldest son Yarburgh Greame, who also took the surname Yarburgh on inheriting his mother's estate at Heslington. Yarburgh made many improvements to the house and gardens at Sewerby, including a large conservatory called the Orangery in the mid 19th century, a clock tower in 1847, and finally a gatehouse in 1848. He also built a church and a school, designed by Sir Gilbert Scott, on the edge of the estate. He died in 1876 at the age of 70 and the estate went to his sister Alicia Maria, the wife of George Lloyd of Stockton Hall, at Stockton-on-the-Forest, York, and afterwards to their younger son, the Revd Yarburgh Gamaliel Lloyd, a Lincolnshire vicar. He changed his name to Lloyd-Greame and his son, Colonel Yarburgh George Lloyd-Greame, inherited in 1890. The Colonel's elder son, also Yarburgh Lloyd-Greame, sold the house and part of the estate to Bridlington Corporation in 1934.

In 1936, the hall and park was opened to the public with a ceremony on 1 June by aviator Amy Johnson. During the Second World War, the Royal Air Force used the house as a hospital and convalescent home for the RAF bases in the area.

In May 2012 plans for a £2.6 million restoration project moved forward with a £949,000 grant from the Heritage Lottery Fund with the work expected to take 30 months.
The first phase of the project (new offices, classrooms and a shop), was started in November 2012 and was completed in August 2013. The second phase to restore the interior of the hall was started in September 2013. The restoration work was completed by August 2014.

Attractions 

Today, Sewerby Hall is a major tourist attraction in the East Riding of Yorkshire, attracting over 150,000 visitors a year.  The hall now houses the Museum of East Yorkshire, including a room dedicated to Amy Johnson, and the Coastguard Museum.  The grounds of the hall are home to a small zoo and aviary as well as an 18-hole putting green, 9-hole pitch and putt and various gardens. As well as tourist activities, the hall also hosts many local community events. The home ground of Sewerby Cricket Club is situated within the grounds, near the cliff top.

References

External links

Sewerby Hall
Photos of Sewerby Hall and surrounding area on geograph

Country houses in the East Riding of Yorkshire
Grade I listed houses
Grade I listed buildings in the East Riding of Yorkshire
Houses completed in 1720
Art museums and galleries in the East Riding of Yorkshire
History museums in the East Riding of Yorkshire
Zoos in England
Aviaries
Museums in the East Riding of Yorkshire
Gardens in the East Riding of Yorkshire
Bridlington
1720 establishments in England